Voge is a surname. Notable people with the surname include:

Ingo Voge (born 1958), East German bobsledder
Margietta Voge, American spy
Petra Voge, East German cross-country skier
Richard George Voge (1904–1948), United States Navy officer

See also
, United States Navy frigate